Carlos Luís Ferreira da Cruz Amarante (Braga, 1748 - Oporto, 1815) was an important Portuguese engineer and architect.

Amarante's father was musician in the court of the Bishop of Braga. He began pursuing an ecclesiastical career, but left the seminary when he was 23 years old to marry Luísa Clara Xavier. After that he pursued a career in engineering and architecture.

Artistically, Amarante led the transition between the late Baroque-Rococo architecture of northern Portugal to modern Neoclassical architecture. He was particularly influenced by the many Neoclassical buildings of English inspiration that were built in Oporto during the 18th century. The church of the sanctuary of Bom Jesus do Monte, built after 1784 to a design by Amarante, is considered one of the first Portuguese churches in Neoclassical style.

Amarante is buried in the Trindade Church in Oporto.

Works

Bom Jesus do Monte - Braga
Populo Church - Braga
Hospital Church - Braga
São Gonçalo Bridge over the Tâmega River in Amarante
Barcas Bridge - Porto
Rectorate of University of Porto - Porto
Trindade Church - Porto
Brejoeira Palace - Monção

1748 births
1815 deaths
Portuguese architects
Portuguese engineers
People from Braga